Allen S. Weiner is an American academic who is a senior lecturer in international law at Stanford Law School.

Weiner is also the co-director of the Stanford Program in International and Comparative Law and the Stanford Center on International Conflict and Negotiation.  He was formerly a Stanford Professor of International Law. He also teaches for undergraduates, working with Scott Sagan on the popular "Face of Battle" and "Rules of War" courses, which introduce topics of military history and the law of armed conflict.

Awards
U.S. State Department Superior Honor Award, 1992 (individual), 1995 (group), 1999 (group)
Federal Bar Association Younger Federal Lawyer Award, 1997
Honorable Mention, Associated Students of Stanford University Teacher of the Year Award, 2006

Select works
International Law, with Barry E. Carter and Phillip R. Trimble, Aspen Publishers, 5th ed., July 2007
 Allen S. Weiner, "Hamdan, Terror, War", 11 Lewis & Clark Law Review 997 (2007).
 Allen S. Weiner, "Law, Just War, and the International Fight Against Terrorism: Is it War?", in Intervention, Terrorism, and Torture: Challenges to Just War Theory in the 21st Century, Stephen Lee, ed., Berlin: Springer Press, 2007.
 Allen S. Weiner, "The Use of Force and Contemporary Security Threats: Old Medicine for New Ills?", 59 Stanford Law Review 415 (2006).
Choice of limits, limits of choice: Argentina, Australia, and the process of political change, Harvard University, 1985

References

External links
FSI bio
 Sequoia Union High School District governing board

Stanford Law School faculty
Harvard University alumni
Stanford Law School alumni
Living people
American lawyers
International law scholars
Year of birth missing (living people)